Giuseppe Montello (born 7 December 1992) is an Italian biathlete. He competed in the 2018 Winter Olympics.

Biathlon results
All results are sourced from the International Biathlon Union.

Olympic Games
0 medals

*The mixed relay was added as an event in 2014.

World Championships
0 medals

*During Olympic seasons competitions are only held for those events not included in the Olympic program.
**The mixed relay was added as an event in 2005.

References

1992 births
Living people
People from Tolmezzo
Biathletes at the 2018 Winter Olympics
Italian male biathletes
Olympic biathletes of Italy
Sportspeople from Friuli-Venezia Giulia